In physics, the Thomas precession, named after Llewellyn Thomas, is a relativistic correction that applies to the spin of an elementary particle or the rotation of a macroscopic gyroscope and relates the angular velocity of the spin of a particle following a curvilinear orbit to the angular velocity of the orbital motion.

For a given inertial frame, if a second frame is Lorentz-boosted relative to it, and a third boosted relative to the second, but non-colinear with the first boost, then the Lorentz transformation between the first and third frames involves a combined boost and rotation, known as the "Wigner rotation" or "Thomas rotation". For accelerated motion, the accelerated frame has an inertial frame at every instant. Two boosts a small time interval (as measured in the lab frame) apart leads to a Wigner rotation after the second boost. In the limit the time interval tends to zero, the accelerated frame will rotate at every instant, so the accelerated frame rotates with an angular velocity.

The precession can be understood geometrically as a consequence of the fact that the space of velocities in relativity is hyperbolic, and so parallel transport of a vector (the gyroscope's angular velocity) around a circle (its linear velocity) leaves it pointing in a different direction, or understood algebraically as being a result of the non-commutativity of Lorentz transformations. Thomas precession gives a correction to the spin–orbit interaction in quantum mechanics, which takes into account the relativistic time dilation between the electron and the nucleus of an atom.

Thomas precession is a kinematic effect in the flat spacetime of special relativity. In the curved spacetime of general relativity, Thomas precession combines with a geometric effect to produce de Sitter precession. Although Thomas precession (net rotation after a trajectory that returns to its initial velocity) is a purely kinematic effect, it only occurs in curvilinear motion and therefore cannot be observed independently of some external force causing the curvilinear motion such as that caused by an electromagnetic field, a gravitational field or a mechanical force, so Thomas precession is usually accompanied by dynamical effects.

If the system experiences no external torque, e.g., in external scalar fields, its spin dynamics are determined only by the Thomas precession. A single discrete Thomas rotation (as opposed to the series of infinitesimal rotations that add up to the Thomas precession) is present in situations anytime there are three or more inertial frames in non-collinear motion, as can be seen using Lorentz transformations.

History 
Thomas precession in relativity was already known to Ludwik Silberstein, in 1914. But the only knowledge Thomas had of relativistic precession came from de Sitter's paper on the relativistic precession of the moon, first published in a book by Eddington.

In 1925 Thomas relativistically recomputed the precessional frequency of the doublet separation in the fine structure of the atom. He thus found the missing factor 1/2, which came to be known as the Thomas half.

This discovery of the relativistic precession of the electron spin led to the understanding of the significance of the relativistic effect. The effect was consequently named "Thomas precession".

Introduction

Definition 
Consider a physical system moving through Minkowski spacetime. Assume that there is at any moment an inertial system such that in it, the system is at rest. This assumption is sometimes called the third postulate of relativity. This means that at any instant, the coordinates and state of the system can be Lorentz transformed to the lab system through some Lorentz transformation.

Let the system be subject to external forces that produce no torque with respect to its center of mass in its (instantaneous) rest frame. The condition of "no torque" is necessary to isolate the phenomenon of Thomas precession. As a simplifying assumption one assumes that the external forces bring the system back to its initial velocity after some finite time. Fix a Lorentz frame  such that the initial and final velocities are zero.

The Pauli–Lubanski spin vector  is defined to be  in the system's rest frame, with  the angular-momentum three-vector about the center of mass. This continuous change is the Thomas precession.

Statement

Consider the motion of a particle. Introduce a lab frame  in which an observer can measure the relative motion of the particle. At each instant of time the particle has an inertial frame in which it is at rest. Here the time  is the coordinate time as measured in the lab frame, not the proper time of the particle.

As a result of the Wigner rotation at every instant, the particle's frame precesses with an angular velocity given by the equation

where × is the cross product and

is the instantaneous Lorentz factor, a function of the particle's instantaneous velocity. Like any angular velocity,  is a pseudovector; its magnitude is the angular speed the particle's frame precesses (in radians per second), and the direction points along the rotation axis. As is usual, the right-hand convention of the cross product is used (see right-hand rule).

The precession depends on accelerated motion, and the non-collinearity of the particle's instantaneous velocity and acceleration. The particle has to move in a curve, say an arc, spiral, helix, or a circular orbit or elliptical orbit, for its frame to precess.

In the non-relativistic limit,  so , and the angular velocity is approximately

The factor of 1/2 turns out to be the critical factor to agree with experimental results. It is informally known as the "Thomas half".

Mathematical explanation

Lorentz transformations

The description of relative motion involves Lorentz transformations, and it is convenient to use them in matrix form; symbolic matrix expressions summarize the transformations and are easy to manipulate, and when required the full matrices can be written explicitly. Also, to prevent extra factors of  cluttering the equations, it is convenient to use the definition  with magnitude  such that .

The spacetime coordinates of the lab frame are collected into a 4×1 column vector, and the boost is represented as a 4×4 symmetric matrix, respectively

and turn

In other frames, the corresponding coordinates are also arranged into column vectors.

At an instant of lab-recorded time  measured in the lab frame, the transformation of spacetime coordinates from the lab frame  to the particle's frame Σ is

The latter is a small increment, and can be conveniently split into components parallel (‖) and perpendicular (⊥) to 

and this composition contains all the required information about the motion between these two lab times.

The composition of two boosts equates to a single boost combined with a Wigner rotation about an axis perpendicular to the relative velocities;

The rotation is given by is a 4×4 rotation matrix  in the axis–angle representation, and coordinate systems are taken to be right-handed. This matrix rotates 3d vectors anticlockwise about an axis (active transformation), or equivalently rotates coordinate frames clockwise about the same axis (passive transformation). The axis-angle vector  parametrizes the rotation, its magnitude  is the angle  has rotated, and direction is parallel to the rotation axis, in this case the axis is parallel to the cross product . If the angles are negative, then the sense of rotation is reversed.

Corresponding to the boost is the (small change in the) boost vector , with magnitude and direction of the relative velocity of the boost (divided by ). The boost  and rotation  here are infinitesimal transformations because  and rotation  are small.

The rotation gives rise to the Thomas precession, but there is a subtlety.

By contrast  and  differ by a boost and lab time interval .

the frame  is rotated in the negative sense.

The rotation is between two instants of lab time. As , the particle's frame rotates at every instant, and the continuous motion of the particle amounts to a continuous rotation with an angular velocity at every instant.

It remains to find what  precisely is.

Extracting the formula

The composition can be obtained by explicitly calculating the matrix product. The boost matrix of  will require the magnitude and Lorentz factor of this vector. Taking advantage of this fact, the magnitude squared of the vector is

Introducing the boost generators

and rotation generators

along with the dot product · facilitates the coordinate independent expression

which holds if  and  lie in any plane. This is an infinitesimal Lorentz transformation in the form of a combined boost and rotation

where

where  is the acceleration of the particle as observed in the lab frame. No forces were specified or used in the derivation so the precession is a kinematical effect - it arises from the geometric aspects of motion. However, forces cause accelerations, so the Thomas precession is observed if the particle is subject to forces.

Thomas precession can also be derived using the Fermi-Walker transport equation.  One assumes uniform circular motion in flat Minkowski spacetime.  The spin 4-vector is orthogonal to the velocity 4-vector.  Fermi-Walker transport preserves this relation.  One finds that the dot product of the acceleration 4-vector with the spin 4-vector varies sinusoidally with time with an angular frequency Ύ ω, where ω is the angular frequency of the circular motion and Ύ=1/√⟨1-v^2/c^2).  This is easily shown by taking the second time derivative of that dot product.  Because this angular frequency exceeds ω, the spin precesses in the retrograde direction.  The difference (γ-1)ω is the Thomas precession angular frequency already given, as is simply shown by realizing that the magnitude of the 3-acceleration is ω v.

Applications

In electron orbitals 

In quantum mechanics Thomas precession is a correction to the spin-orbit interaction, which takes into account the relativistic time dilation between the electron and the nucleus in hydrogenic atoms.

Basically, it states that spinning objects precess when they accelerate in special relativity because Lorentz boosts do not commute with each other.

To calculate the spin of a particle in a magnetic field, one must also take into account Larmor precession.

In a Foucault pendulum 

The rotation of the swing plane of Foucault pendulum can be treated as a result of parallel transport of the pendulum in a 2-dimensional sphere of Euclidean space. The hyperbolic space of velocities in Minkowski spacetime represents a 3-dimensional (pseudo-) sphere with imaginary radius and imaginary timelike coordinate. Parallel transport of a spinning particle in relativistic velocity space leads to Thomas precession, which is similar to the rotation of the swing plane of a Foucault pendulum. The angle of rotation in both cases is determined by the area integral of curvature in agreement with the Gauss–Bonnet theorem.

Thomas precession gives a correction to the precession of a Foucault pendulum. For a Foucault pendulum located in the city of Nijmegen in the Netherlands the correction is:

Note that it is more than two orders of magnitude smaller than the precession due to the general-relativistic correction arising from frame-dragging, the Lense–Thirring precession.

See also

 Velocity-addition formula
 Relativistic angular momentum
 Holonomy

Remarks

Notes

References 
 Thomas L H The kinematics of an electron with an axis, Phil. Mag. 7 1927 1-23

 (free access)

.

Textbooks

External links 
Mathpages article on Thomas Precession
Alternate, detailed derivation of Thomas Precession (by Robert Littlejohn)
Short derivation of the Thomas precession

Special relativity
Atomic physics
Precession